Mitochondrial protein 18 kDa, also known as MTP18, is a human gene.

References

Further reading